Sphaerodes is a genus of fungi within the Ceratostomataceae family.

Species
Sphaerodes beatonii
Sphaerodes compressa
Sphaerodes ellipsospora
Sphaerodes episphaerium
Sphaerodes fimicola
Sphaerodes manginii
Sphaerodes micropertusa
Sphaerodes mycoparasitica
Sphaerodes ornata
Sphaerodes perplexa
Sphaerodes pseudofimicola
Sphaerodes quadrangularis
Sphaerodes quandrangularis
Sphaerodes retispora'''Sphaerodes singaporensisSphaerodes tenuissima References 

 External links 

 Sphaerodes'' at Index Fungorum

Sordariomycetes genera
Melanosporales
Taxa named by Frederic Clements